Janusz Mariusz Hajnos (27 August 1968 – 29 August 2019) was a Polish ice hockey player. He played for Podhale Nowy Targ, GKS Katowice, and KTH Krynica during his career. He also played for the Polish national team at the 1992 Winter Olympics. He led the Polish Ekstraklasa in goal scoring during the 1991–92 season.

Hajnos died on 29 August 2019 in Nowy Targ, two days after his 51st birthday.

References

External links
 

1968 births
2019 deaths
GKS Katowice (ice hockey) players
Ice hockey players at the 1992 Winter Olympics
KTH Krynica players
Olympic ice hockey players of Poland
People from Nowy Targ
Polish ice hockey right wingers
Sportspeople from Lesser Poland Voivodeship